Sofia Viktorovna Nikitchuk (born 20 October 1993) is a Russian actress, model and beauty pageant titleholder who was crowned Miss Russia 2015 and represented her country at the Miss World 2015 pageant.

Personal life
Was born on 20 October 1993 in Snezhinsk, Chelyabinsk Oblast, Russia. Her mother Tatiana was a doctor, while father Viktor served in Russian military.

In 2015 she won the title of Miss Yekaterinburg (Subdivision: Sverdlovsk Oblast). She represented the subdivision at the Miss Russia 2015 contest.

She played the part of Elena of Moldavia in the historical TV drama series "Sophia" (2016) made by VGTRK.

Miss Russia 2015
On 18 April 2015 was crowned Miss Russia 2015 at Barvikha Luxury Village Concert Hall in Moscow.

Miss World 2015
As Miss Russia 2015, represented Russia at Miss World 2015. She was awarded 1st-runner up on 19 December.

References

External links
 Miss Russia Official Website
 Video: Sofia Nikitchuk crowned Miss Russia 2015

1993 births
Living people
Actors from Yekaterinburg
Russian female models
Russian beauty pageant winners
Miss Russia winners
Miss World 2015 delegates
Russian television actresses